Cefn Rhigos (name meaning '(the) ridge (at) Rhigos') is a hamlet (place) to the west of the village of Rhigos, Wales. Despite being eight miles from the town centre, for postal purposes it comes under Aberdare.

It is the most westerly named settlement of the Cynon Valley. The border with The Vale of Neath lies a few hundred yards to the west.

External links 
www.geograph.co.uk : photos of Cefn Rhigos and surrounding area

Villages in Rhondda Cynon Taf